Vani is a municipality of Georgia, in the region of Imereti. Its main town is Vani.

Geography
In 1930 it was separated into a separate district. Located in the extreme southwestern part of Imereti. The municipality is bordered by Baghdati, Samtredia, Tskaltubo, Adigeni and Chokhatauri municipalities. The main units of relief are the northern slopes of the Meskheti Range, the Imereti lowlands and the hilly foothills of the transitional southern Imereti. The northern part is occupied by the Imereti plain. The Rioni River runs north of the municipality. Rivers flow in the territory of Van: Sulori, Kumuri and others.

Economy
The leading sector of the economy is agriculture. The lands occupy . The main vine varieties are: Tsolikouri, Tsitska and Aladasturi. Horticulture is also developed. The wealth of the main minerals are construction materials: andesite, basalt, alabaster (Inashauri), ceramic clay, limestone (Isriti), mineral waters (Inashauri, Sulori, Chokiani), thermal waters (Amagleba, Sulori). The main transport hub of the municipality is the city of Vani, which is connected by roads to the cities of Kutaisi, Baghdati, Samtredia and Lanchkhuti. The city is connected to the main railways of the Caucasus from Kutaisi and Samtredia. Tourism is also very important for the Vani economy.

Politics

Vani Municipal Assembly (Georgian: ვანის საკრებულო) is a representative body in Vani Municipality. currently consisting of 30 members. The council assembles into session regularly, to consider subject matters such as code changes, utilities, taxes, city budget, oversight of city government and more. Vani sakrebulo is elected every four year. The last election was held in October 2021.

Historical sites
There are balneological resorts on the territory of the municipality: "Sulori" and "Amagleba", which is famous for its thermal and mineral waters. There are historical monuments on the territory of Vani: St. George Church in Shuamta; Melouri Fortress and XIV c. Melouri Church in the village. 12th– to 13th-century Church of the Archangel; Tamar Fortress in the village. In Inashauri; Bzvani Cave; Gormaghali fortress in the village. In Sulor; Epiphany Church in the village. In Shuamta; 18th-century Trinity Church in the village. In Dikhashkho; XI Church in the village. XVI church in the village. In Salomina; Two castles of the feudal era and a church from the 19th century in the village. In the upper part; 1619 Church of the Savior in the village. In raising; Medieval castle, church and tower in the village. In the arrow; Archangel Church in the village. In the lower extremity; The castle village of Maisaour; According to the legend, there is a cross erected on the territory of Vani municipality by Andrew the First-Called.

Tourist attractions

The most famous tourist site is Otar Lortkipanidze Vani Archaeological Museum-Reserve. Its complete rehabilitation will be completed in 2019, making the Van Museum the best in the Transcaucasian region. The Archaeological Museum will house restoration and foundation departments, a children's education center, a library, and exhibition and conference halls equipped with modern technologies. The museum preserves the excavated archeological materials, presents architecture, goldsmithing, bronze sculptures. All the exhibits of the world-famous exhibition "Golden Colchis" have been excavated in the ancient city of Van, most of which will be returned to the museum. The components of the museum-reserve complex are the city of Vani. also historically and economically significant  is Vani archaeological site

Administrative divisions

There are 21 administrative units in Vani municipality: Vani, Shuamta, Mukedi, Tsikhesulori, Dikhashkho, Gadidi, Gora, Tobanieri, Amagleba, Mtisdziri, Fereta, Salominao, Salkhino, Saprasia, Sulori, Ukhuti, Kumuri, Zedavani, Zeindari, Dzulukhi and Bzvani.

Settlements

See also 
 List of municipalities in Georgia (country)

References

External links 
 Districts of Georgia, Statoids.com

Vani
Municipalities of Imereti